"Sick & Tired" is a pop song by Swedish band The Cardigans. It was released in September 1994 as the third single from their debut album, Emmerdale (1994), in Sweden and as their first single in Japan. It was subsequently featured on the international release of their second album, Life (1995), and issued as the first single from it in March 1995. A reissue later the same year became the group's first top-forty hit in the United Kingdom. In February 1996 the song reached number one in Iceland, staying at the summit for four weeks.

The song addresses the aftermath of a summer love affair which ended badly, leaving the narrator "sick and tired". In the chorus, the narrator addresses her former lover, suggesting that "you can always say you did no major harm", before immediately rejecting such a notion with "oh spare me if you please".

All of the B-sides from both issues of the single were later included on the compilation The Other Side of the Moon. All except the cover of "The Boys Are Back in Town" also appeared on the 2CD edition of Best Of The Cardigans.

Critical reception
In his weekly UK chart commentary in Dotmusic, James Masterton wrote, "The single is a lovely laid-back oddity which deserves a far bigger chart audience than it is likely to get."

Music video
A music video was produced to promote the single, directed by Swedish director Björn Lindgren. It was later published on The Cardigans's official YouTube channel in February 2016. The video has amassed more than 900,000 views as of September 2021.

Track listing

 Sweden CD single (1994) and international CD single (1995)
"Sick & Tired"
"Plain Parade"
"Laika"
"Pooh Song"

 UK CD single (re-issue) (1995)
"Sick & Tired"
"Pooh Song"
"The Boys Are Back in Town"
"Carnival (Puck version)"

Charts

Weekly charts

Year-end charts

References

1995 singles
The Cardigans songs
Songs written by Peter Svensson
1995 songs
Songs written by Magnus Sveningsson
Number-one singles in Iceland
English-language Swedish songs